The Seattle Seahawks are a professional American football team organized in 1976 and based in Seattle, Washington, US, that plays in the National Football League. This article details the history of the Seattle Seahawks American football club.

Overview
As one of the agreed parts of the 1970 AFL-NFL Merger, the NFL began planning to expand from 26 to 28 teams. Ralph Wilson was the first to propose a team for Seattle; due to the decrepit stadium situation at War Memorial Stadium and the reluctance of Buffalo, New York officials to replace it In 1971, he openly threatened to move his team, the Buffalo Bills, to Seattle. Buffalo officials acquiesced and built what is now Highmark Stadium, in 1973, keeping the Bills in Buffalo, where they remain. Pro Football Hall of Famer Hugh McElhenny, a Seattle resident and University of Washington alumnus, signed a contract with a group called the Seattle Sea Lions in hopes of bringing an NFL franchise to the city. In anticipation, he named himself general manager of the non-existent "Seattle Kings" in May 1972, and the next year the franchise gained the backing of Edward Nixon, brother of president Richard Nixon. However, McElhenny's plan ultimately fell through. On June 15, 1972 Seattle Professional Football Inc., a group of Seattle business and community leaders started by Herman Sarkowsky and Ned Skinner, announced its intention to acquire an NFL franchise for Seattle. Almost 2 years later on June 4, 1974, the NFL awarded the group an expansion franchise.  On December 5, 1974, NFL Commissioner Pete Rozelle announced the official signing of the franchise agreement by Lloyd W. Nordstrom, representing the Nordstrom family as majority partners for the consortium. Nordstrom died of a heart attack on January 20, 1976, just months before the Seahawks played their first game.

On March 5, 1975, John Thompson, a former University of Washington executive, was hired as the general manager of the yet-unnamed team.  The nickname Seahawks was selected on June 17, 1975 after a public naming contest which drew more than 20,000 entries and over 1,700 different names. 151 people had submitted the name in the list such as Clark McMillan and Hazel Cooke (who each received a framed piece of literature for their efforts). Five names were selected as finalists: Sockeyes, Mariners, Olympics, Evergreens, and Seahawks. Nordstrom and his group telephoned Rozelle and Jim Kensil (league executive director) for a response on the names, and their favorable reaction to Seahawks led to the use of the name for the team. The nickname was previously used by the All-America Football Conference Miami Seahawks.  Thompson recruited and hired Jack Patera, a Minnesota Vikings assistant coach, to be the first head coach of the new team. Patera was introduced as the new head coach at a press conference on January 3, 1976. Thompson would serve as general manager for the first seven seasons, which resulted in a 39–62 record with no playoff appearances and only two non-losing seasons – 9–7 in 1978 and 1979. The expansion draft was held March 30 and 31, 1976, with Seattle and the Tampa Bay Buccaneers alternating picks for 39 rounds selecting unprotected players from the other 26 teams in the league. In the 1976 draft, the Seahawks were awarded the 2nd overall pick, which they used on defensive tackle Steve Niehaus. The team took the field for the first time on August 1, 1976 in a pre-season game against the San Francisco 49ers in the then brand new Kingdome.

The Seahawks are the only NFL team to switch conferences twice. The franchise began play in 1976 in the NFC West division but switched conferences with the Buccaneers after one season and joined the AFC West. This realignment was dictated by the league as part of the 1976 expansion plan, so that both expansion teams could play each other twice and every other NFL franchise. Between 1977 and 2002, their division rivals were Denver, San Diego, Kansas City and Oakland.

Seattle has won ten division titles in their franchise history: the 1988 and 1999 AFC West titles, and the 2004, 2005, 2006, 2007, 2010, 2013, 2014, and 2016 NFC West titles. They have won the NFC Championship Game thrice in 2005, 2013 and 2014, and lost the AFC Championship Game once in 1983; as a result, they are the only team to have appeared in both the AFC and NFC Conference Championship games. The Seahawks have one Super Bowl victory in 2013 and two losses (2005 and 2014). Prior to 2005 Seattle had the longest drought of playoff victories of any NFL team, dating back to the 1984 season.  That drought was ended with a 20–10 win over the Washington Redskins in the 2005 playoffs. The all-time Seahawks playoff record is 12–12.

Beginnings: 1976–1978
The Seahawks had their biggest "win" before ever taking the field for a regular season game. On August 26, 1976 the Seahawks traded an eighth round pick in 1977 to the Houston Oilers for Steve Largent. The franchise's first win came on October 17 when they beat their expansion brethren Tampa Bay Buccaneers 13–10 at Tampa Bay.  On November 7 they won their first game at home, 30–13 over the Atlanta Falcons. Those were the lone victories in an inaugural 2–12 season. However, the exciting play of Jim Zorn and Largent served notice of the entertainment to come.

The Seahawks hosted the 1977 Pro Bowl in the Kingdome on January 17, 1977, and a sellout crowd of 63,214 saw the AFC beat the NFC 24–14. It was the first sellout in Pro Bowl history.

In a reversal of the cunning that brought them Largent, the Seahawks traded their first round pick in 1977 to the Dallas Cowboys in exchange for a first and 3 second round draft picks. Dallas selected Tony Dorsett, who threatened to play in the Canadian Football League if he was drafted by the Seahawks, with the pick obtained from Seattle. 

The 1977 season began with four straight losses before Tampa Bay came to town. The Seahawks won "Expansion Bowl II" by a score of 30–23. Two weeks later the season highlight happened on October 30 when quarterback Jim Zorn came back from missing four games with an injury to throw four touchdown passes in a 56–17 win over the Buffalo Bills at the Kingdome. The 1977 Seahawks finished with a record of 5–9, to establish a then record for wins by a second year franchise.

In 1978, the Seahawks achieved their first winning season with a 9–7 record as WR Steve Largent finished second in the NFL with 1,168 receiving yards, Jack Patera was named NFL Coach of the Year and Jim Zorn was named AFC Player of the Year by the Touchdown Club of Washington, D.C. Season highlights included becoming the first team since 1965 to sweep the Raiders (27-7 win at home and a 17–16 win in Oakland).

1979 saw the Seahawks attract a national following after their first Monday Night Football appearance on October 29, 1979. After trailing 14–0 against the Atlanta Falcons, Seattle battled back to win 31–28. A fake field goal pass from Zorn to kicker Efren Herrera led Howard Cosell to exclaim "the Seahawks are giving the nation a lesson in entertaining football!" The good vibe was short-lived, as the next week the Seahawks set an NFL record for the lowest total offense in one game (minus 7 yards) in a 24–0 loss to the Los Angeles Rams at the Kingdome.  The team rebounded from that embarrassment to win 5 of their last 6 games, including a 30–7 victory over the New York Jets on MNF, to finish with a 9–7 record.

1979–1982: Final Patera years
Great hopes after consecutive wins were crushed in 1980. The Seahawks lost their last 9 games to turn a 4–3 record into a 4–12 season, losing all eight home games. The collapse did enable the Seahawks to select safety Kenny Easley out of UCLA in the first round of the 1981 draft.

In 1981, the Seahawks lost five of their first six games on their way to a 6–10 record. Steve Largent had another stellar season with 1,224 receiving yards. Dave Krieg made his first career start in place of an injured Zorn on December 6, 1981, completing 20 of 26 passes in a 27–23 win over the Jets.

In the strike-shortened season of 1982, the Seahawks fired Patera during the strike after losing their first two games. Interim coach Mike McCormack finished the rest of the season and the Seahawks compiled a 4–5 record.

1983–1991: The Chuck Knox era

1983

After a disappointing 1982 season (which was shortened because of a players' strike), the Seahawks moved interim coach Mike McCormack back into the front office and hired Chuck Knox as their head coach. In 1983, the Seahawks were battling for a playoff berth with a 6–6 record. Then in week 13, the Seahawks beat the Kansas City Chiefs 51–48 at the Kingdome to start their winning ways. They won 2 of the next 3 games to earn their first ever playoff berth. In the wild-card playoffs the Seahawks shut down the Denver Broncos and their rookie quarterback John Elway 31–7. The next week at the Miami Orange Bowl the Seahawks beat the Miami Dolphins in a dramatic fashion, coming from behind, driving 66 yards in 5 plays, ending with a dramatic Curt Warner TD run.  Seattle then recovered a fumble on Miami's kick return to seal the 27–20 victory, defeating an up-and-coming rookie quarterback Dan Marino. The Seahawks' miracle season ended in the AFC Championship Game as they lost to the eventual Super Bowl XVIII champion Los Angeles Raiders 30–14. Despite the 1983 season ending on a sour note, it was the first breakthrough season for the Seahawks.  Curt Warner rushed for 1449 yards, scored 14 touchdowns, and was named AFC Rookie of the Year.  Chuck Knox was named AFC Coach of the Year.

1984

The first game of 1984 was costly, as Curt Warner suffered a season ending knee injury in the 33–0 win over the Cleveland Browns, the first Opening Day win in team history. Without Warner, the "Ground Chuck" offense became "Air Knox". Led by QB Dave Krieg, the Seahawks enjoyed a then franchise record 8-game winning streak and a 12–4 record. The Seahawk defense posted 3 shutouts.  One of the shutouts occurred on November 4 where they beat the Chiefs 45–0 in a game highlighted by 4 touchdowns off interception returns (still an NFL record).  A season ending 2-game losing streak cost them the division title and forced a wild card game against the Raiders. The Seahawks rode running back Dan Doornink and prevailed 13–7 in the team's last playoff victory for 21 years, avenging last year's AFC Championship Game loss. The Seahawks, in turn, fell to the Super Bowl bound Miami Dolphins 31–10 in the divisional playoffs, with the Dolphins exacting revenge for their loss in the divisional playoffs at the hands of the Seahawks the previous year. Chuck Knox was named AFC Coach of the Year for the second year in a row.

1985–1990

The 1985 campaign was one of the most frustrating in the team's history. Seattle went through an alternating pattern of winning two games in a row and losing two in a row, to end at 8-8. Quarterback Dave Krieg passed for 3,602 yards on the season. A final game loss at home to Denver was a microcosm of the season, as the Seahawks squandered an early lead and an attempt at a game-tying field goal hit the upright as time expired.

The 1986 season is generally considered one of the "ones that got away". A 5–2 start was ruined by a 4-game losing streak. Improbably, the team then went on a roll that saw them win their final 5 games in convincing fashion. Included in the run were a 31-14 road victory over the Dallas Cowboys on Thanksgiving, a 37–0 shutout of the Los Angeles Raiders on Monday Night Football and a season ending 41–16 victory over the Super Bowl bound Denver Broncos. Despite a 10–6 record, the Seahawks failed to qualify for the playoffs due to a tiebreaker. They were the only team to beat both Super Bowl teams (Denver and the New York Giants) in 1986.

1987 began with great expectations and predictions of a Super Bowl appearance. The Seahawks had won a lottery for the first pick in a supplemental draft, and they selected Oklahoma University linebacker Brian Bosworth, the 1985 and 1986 Dick Butkus award winner. The 1987 team, like Bosworth, never did live up to expectations. After an early-season 24-day labor dispute, the team qualified for the playoffs as a wild card with a 9–6 record. A 23–20 overtime loss to the Houston Oilers in the playoffs was marred by a controversial call nullifying an apparent Fredd Young interception deep in Oilers territory in the sudden-death period.

Before the 1988 season began, the team gained new ownership for the first time, as California land developer Ken Behring purchased the team from the Nordstrom family. That season, the team won its first AFC West division title, beating the Los Angeles Raiders 43–37 on the road to finish with a 9–7 record. The Seahawks lost 21–13 in the divisional playoffs to the Super Bowl bound Cincinnati Bengals. The next year, Behring named former Los Angeles Raiders head coach Tom Flores team president and general manager.

1989 saw the Seahawks fall to a 7–9 record. During the season, the overhyped and underperforming Brian Bosworth suffered a career-ending shoulder injury, and became an actor. Also retiring was wide receiver Steve Largent, the last remaining player from the team's inaugural 1976 season.

Despite a poor early-season performance in 1990, the Seahawks managed to recover and go 9–7, but were competing in a strong division and so missed the playoffs.

1991–1995: Turmoil and Mediocrity
These years were the most tumultuous of the franchise's history so far. 1991 was Chuck Knox's last year as head coach of the Seahawks. After finishing with a 7–9 record, he resigned to rejoin the Los Angeles Rams. The year also saw Seattle make another bad draft choice in quarterback Dan McGwire, the brother of baseball star Mark McGwire. Widely expected to take over as starting QB, he struggled on the field and ultimately never got that position. The Seahawks held onto McGwire until 1995, then traded him to the Dolphins.

Team President/GM Tom Flores assumed the head coaching duties for the 1992 season. Longtime quarterback Dave Krieg was ousted in 1992 and replaced by three different quarterbacks (first-round pick Dan McGwire, Stan Gelbaugh and Kelly Stouffer). 1992 was also the Seahawks' worst year ever when they finished 2-14 and scoring just 140 points in the regular season. The Seattle offense was historically inept, and the only bright spot for the 1992 season was defensive tackle Cortez Kennedy being declared NFL Defensive Player of the Year.

In 1993, the Seahawks drafted Rick Mirer out of the University of Notre Dame with the second pick in the draft, hoping to make him the franchise's quarterback of the future. Mirer looked to be on his way to stardom as he shared the NFL's Offensive Rookie of the Year Award with former college teammate Jerome Bettis in his first season.  The honeymoon soon turned sour as his inconsistent play in the following three seasons led to several benchings and eventually his departure in a trade to the Chicago Bears following the 1996 season.

In 1994, the Seahawks temporarily moved to nearby Husky Stadium on the campus of the University of Washington for the preseason and 3 regular season games as repairs were being made to the Kingdome after an acoustic tile fell inside the stadium. Upon returning to the Kingdome, the team finished with a 6–10 record; Tom Flores was replaced as president by David Behring, son of owner Ken Behring, and as head coach by University of Miami coach Dennis Erickson. The 1995 season was only average, with the Seahawks going 8-8, following by a 7-9 campaign in 1996.

1996–1998: Paul Allen takes over
In January 1996, Seahawks owner Ken Behring announced that he was moving the franchise to Los Angeles, where the team would play at Anaheim Stadium (the same venue that the Rams had abandoned for St. Louis, Missouri the previous year). Behring claimed safety concerns (specifically the building's structural integrity in the event of an earthquake) as his reason for breaking the team's lease with King County.  However, seismologists found Behring's claims to be unproven. Also, the Los Angeles area is even more earthquake-prone than Seattle. Although Behring moved the team's operations to Anaheim, his plans for a full move were scuttled when lawyers discovered that the Seahawks were locked into the Kingdome through 2005; additionally, the NFL threatened Behring with fining him $500,000 each day if he didn't bring the team back from Southern California. Having seen his effort to permanently relocate the franchise thwarted, Behring decided to sell. A potential buyer was found in Microsoft co-founder Paul Allen, who reached an agreement to buy the club if a new stadium would be built. After funding a special statewide election for stadium financing, a new stadium for the Seahawks went forward and Allen purchased the team.

Under the new ownership, Bob Whitsitt was installed as president of the club and big-name players such as Chad Brown, Warren Moon, and Ricky Watters were brought in raising hopes in Seattle that a page had been turned. What followed instead was more mediocrity as the club in 1997 and 1998 failed to get over the .500 mark with consecutive 8-8 marks. This led to head coach Dennis Erickson ultimately being fired at the end of the 1998 season. This period was not without its memorable moments, specifically Vinny Testaverde's "Phantom Touchdown" in a regular season game, an officiating error that became a primary factor in the NFL's reinstatement of instant replay. The error resulted in a 32–31 loss to the New York Jets.

The NFL officially apologized for the officiating error. Instant replay was reinstated in the NFL the following season. Referee Phil Luckett, who headed the crew that made the touchdown call (the call itself was made by head linesman Earnie Frantz), was later reassigned at his request to back judge, and is also infamous for another controversial issue during the Thanksgiving game on November 26 between the Pittsburgh Steelers and the Detroit Lions.

1999–2008: The Mike Holmgren era

1999–2001
In 1999, the Seahawks made their biggest coaching hire with the appointment of Green Bay Packers head coach Mike Holmgren. Coming off his success with the Packers, Holmgren was given the dual role of general manager and head coach. The hiring brought instant credibility to the franchise as under Holmgren's guidance, the Seahawks won their second division title and first playoff berth since 1988. That year included a memorable 27–7 win over Holmgren's former team, the Green Bay Packers on Monday Night Football but despite a strong 8–2 start, the Seahawks lost 5 of their last 6 to close out the regular season. This skid continued on into the playoffs as the Seahawks lost the final game in the Kingdome 20–17 to Dan Marino and the Miami Dolphins in the AFC Wild Card round; the game was Marino's only career road playoff win.

For the 2000 and 2001 seasons the Seahawks moved to Husky Stadium while their new stadium was being built. The Seahawks drafted running back Shaun Alexander in 2000 as their running back of the future. The move to Husky Stadium could not halt the Seahawks' decline, as they finished a disappointing 6-10 in 2000.

Holmgren then traded for Green Bay Packers backup quarterback Matt Hasselbeck and made him the starting quarterback. But Hasselbeck struggled in the first half of the 2001 season compiling a 5–7 record. Hasselbeck was replaced by former Super Bowl winner Trent Dilfer who steadied the ship and led the Seahawks to a 9-7 finish and a narrow playoff miss in the team's final season in the AFC.

2002: Return to the NFC West

Big changes were afoot in 2002. When the Seahawks left Husky Stadium at the end of the 2001 season they were part of the AFC West, but when they moved into Seahawks Stadium they were now part of the NFC West, where they were based in their inaugural season 26 years earlier. This was because of the 2002 divisional realignment caused by the addition of the expansion Houston Texans, and to keep traditional divisional rivalries, such as Dallas-Washington despite Dallas being further west than St. Louis. The year was one of ups-and-downs as Dilfer was injured in Week 7 and Hasselbeck became the starting quarterback. He ended the season on a 3-game winning streak, and Shaun Alexander led the NFC with 18 touchdowns. But the team finished with a 7–9 record and rumblings began over whether Holmgren was up to having dual roles as de facto general manager and head coach.

2003

Before the 2003 season, Holmgren relinquished his general manager duties so that he could concentrate exclusively on coaching the team.  This move was especially hard for Holmgren as one of the factors for him leaving the Packers was to step out of the shadow of long-time general manager Ron Wolf.  With their head coach focused solely on the coaching side, the Seahawks made the playoffs as a wild card with a 10–6 record and finished with an impressive 8–0 mark at home. The Seahawks faced Holmgren's former team, the Green Bay Packers at Lambeau Field.  The Seahawks came out strong but blew several opportunities (including a crucial endzone drop by receiver Koren Robinson) and were forced to go to overtime.  It was during the coin-flip where quarterback Hasselbeck made the prediction "we want the ball, and we're going to score." Unfortunately for the Seahawks, an Al Harris interception returned for a touchdown sealed their fate, as they lost 33–27.

2004

The Seahawks entered the 2004 season with lofty expectations.  Publications such as Sports Illustrated predicted that the team would represent the NFC in Super Bowl XXXIX.  The Seahawks started off strongly, going 3-0 including a 34–0 shutout of the lowly San Francisco 49ers at home.  The season took a dramatic turn for the worse, however, when the Seahawks blew a 27–10 lead late in the fourth quarter to their division-rivals, the St. Louis Rams.  Trailing 27-10 late in the fourth quarter, the Rams scored to pull within ten with 5:34 remaining on the clock.  This was followed by a 41-yard touchdown pass to Kevin Curtis, making the score 27–24.  After the Seahawks failed to convert on a critical third down, leaving 1:14 on the game clock, the Rams tied the game on the ensuing possession, sending the game into overtime.  In the extra period, the Rams won the game on a stunning 52-yard touchdown catch by Shaun McDonald.  The Seahawks never fully recovered from the shocking loss and went on to win only six of their last twelve games.

The Seahawks had another memorable fourth quarter meltdown against the Dallas Cowboys on Monday Night Football. As Seattle led 39-28 late in the fourth quarter, Vinny Testaverde completed a touchdown pass to Keyshawn Johnson, leaving 1:45 on the game clock. Jason Witten recovered the ensuing onside kick, and Julius Jones was heavily featured in the Cowboys' 57-yard drive to win the game. Jones finished with a game-high 198 rushing yards for the night.

The Seahawks won their first NFC West title with a 28–26 win over the Atlanta Falcons in the final regular season game. The team's celebrations were overshadowed by bickering between Holmgren and running back Shaun Alexander, stemming from Holmgren's decision to bench Alexander for precautionary reasons midway through the team's final game of the season. Alexander missed the 2004 rushing title by a single yard, with the honor instead going to New York Jets running back Curtis Martin.  The Seahawks ended their 2004 season by losing to the Rams 27–20 in the NFC Wild Card game, the first playoff game at Qwest Field, in what was their third loss to the Rams.

2005: First Conference Championship

The 2005 season saw them advance to the Super Bowl for the first time in the team's history. They were the NFC representative in Super Bowl XL, a game they lost to the Pittsburgh Steelers. The Seahawks compiled a 13–3 record in the regular season, easily winning the NFC West and clinching home field advantage in the NFC playoffs. There, they beat the Washington Redskins and Carolina Panthers to win the George Halas Trophy and advance to the Super Bowl, the first in franchise history.

Super Bowl XL

Seattle fell short in its bid for its first NFL title, losing to the Pittsburgh Steelers at Super Bowl XL in Detroit, Michigan on February 5, 2006 by a score of 21–10. Although the Seahawks outgained the Steelers, 396 yards to 339, and led in time of possession, those differences were erased after the first quarter in which Seattle could only muster a field goal. Pittsburgh won on the strength of three big plays converted for touchdowns, including the longest run in Super Bowl history. Seattle, on the other hand, was plagued by highly questionable penalties, dropped passes, and an interception during a drive deep into Pittsburgh territory.

The controversial penalty calls made during Super Bowl XL were met with criticism from both fans and members of the media, many of whom suggested that the officials had wrongly nullified several key plays made by the Seahawks offense. Jason Whitlock encapsulated the views of a few when he wrote the day after the game, "Leavy and his crew ruined Super Bowl XL. Am I the only one who would like to hear them defend their incompetence?" In response to the criticisms, NFL spokesman Greg Aiello said in a statement, "The game was properly officiated, including, as in most NFL games, some tight plays that produced disagreement about the calls made by the officials." The game ended a playoff season that was plagued by complaints about officiating.

Seahawks head coach Mike Holmgren fueled the debate upon returning to Seattle, saying during a Seahawks rally, "We knew it was going to be tough going up against the Pittsburgh Steelers. I didn't know we were going to have to play the guys in the striped shirts as well."  Al Michaels commented during a Sunday Night Football game a few months later, "The fact that Holmgren was not fined for that statement speaks volumes to me." Michaels explained he was alluding to Holmgren's need to "blow off steam", but also suggested a perceived admission by the NFL that something went wrong in that game. Both Michaels and John Madden noted Seattle's mistakes, such as poor clock management at the end of each half.

In 2010, before meeting with Seattle-area media on the new NFL rule changes, referee Bill Leavy unexpectedly apologized to the Seahawks for his mistakes in the game.

"It was a tough thing for me. I kicked two calls in the fourth quarter and I impacted the game and as an official you never want to do that. It left me with a lot of sleepless nights and I think about it constantly. I'll go to my grave wishing that I'd been better. I know that I did my best at that time, but it wasn't good enough. When we make mistakes, you got to step up and own them. It's something that all officials have to deal with, but unfortunately when you have to deal with it in the Super Bowl it's difficult."

2006

The Seahawks repeated as NFC West champions with a 9–7 record; their season included a 34-24 pounding of the Green Bay Packers on Monday Night Football and a pair of two-point wins over the St. Louis Rams.  The Seahawks hosted the Dallas Cowboys in the NFC Wildcard Playoffs; trailing 20-13 the Seahawks pounced on a botched Tony Romo throw to Terry Glenn in Dallas' endzone for a safety, then scored on a 37-yard Hasselbeck touchdown.  The Cowboys drove downfield but on the ensuing field goal attempt Romo (the holder) blew the snap and was stopped in his rush to the endzone.  A desperate last-second Romo throw was batted down, and the Seahawks won 21–20.  The Seahawks fell 27–24 in overtime to the Chicago Bears in the divisional round of the NFC playoffs.

2007

The Seattle Seahawks finished the regular season with a 10–6 record, winning their fourth consecutive, NFC West title, and defeated the Washington Redskins 35–14 in the first round of the playoffs, to advance to an NFC Divisional Round Playoff game against the Green Bay Packers, where they were defeated 42–20.

2008

The Seattle Seahawks made little noise in free agency, although they did address their need for change at running back, by cutting oft-injured former league MVP Shaun Alexander and signing both speedster Julius Jones from the Dallas Cowboys and the more powerful T. J. Duckett from the Detroit Lions. A major free agency casualty was suffered, however, when kicker Josh Brown, who hit 6 last minute game winning field goals in his 5-year Seahawks career (including 4 during the 2006 season, an NFL single season record), left for the division-rival St. Louis Rams. It was also announced that this season, Holmgren's tenth as head coach, was also to be his last; defensive backs coach Jim L. Mora (the son of former New Orleans Saints and Indianapolis Colts head coach Jim E. Mora) was to replace Holmgren at season's end.

Injuries plagued the team from the very outset, with receivers Deion Branch and Bobby Engram both missing the first three games and Nate Burleson suffering a season-ending knee injury in the first game, a 34–10 loss to the Buffalo Bills. Quarterback Matt Hasselbeck was also hounded by a back injury, which forced him off the field for a total of nine games, contributing to a six-game losing streak during the second half of the season. Although the Seahawks won two of their last three games, including a 13–3 victory over the New York Jets in Holmgren's last home game at Qwest Field, the team finished third in the NFC West and end up with a record of 4-12, the worst the franchise had seen since 1992. This also marked the first time since 2002 the Seahawks missed the playoffs.

2009: Jim L. Mora's only season

The 2009 offseason began with Jim L. Mora taking over the head coaching job over Holmgren. A big splash was made in the free agency market when the Seahawks managed to land talented wide receiver T. J. Houshmandzadeh from the Cincinnati Bengals and All-Pro running back Edgerrin James from division rival Arizona. In the draft, the Seahawks used their 4th overall pick on linebacker Aaron Curry from Wake Forest University, and sought to bolster their offensive line in the second round with 49th overall pick Max Unger.

Despite an undefeated preseason record and a 28–0 shutout of the Rams in the first week, things quickly began to unravel when Matt Hasselbeck again found himself sidelined after a hit by Patrick Willis in a Week 2 matchup against the 49ers left him with fractured ribs. Backup Seneca Wallace went 0-2 as his replacement, including a heartbreaking 25–19 loss to the Chicago Bears in which kicker Olindo Mare missed two field goal attempts. Though they were on the fringes of the playoff hunt all the way up to Week 13, the team's season ended on four straight losses, three of which were blowouts against the Houston Texans, Tampa Bay Buccaneers and Green Bay Packers. Meanwhile, general manager Tim Ruskell resigned late in the season when he could not be guaranteed an extension at the end of the year. Though finishing with a slightly better record than the previous season at 5-11, it was not enough for Mora to save his job, as his controversial calling-out of Mare after the Chicago loss and questioning the toughness of injured first-string center Chris Spencer caused a backlash among fans, and he was fired at the end of the season to make room for new head coach Pete Carroll.

2010–present: Pete Carroll era

2010

Pete Carroll took over as the Seahawks head coach in 2010.

Thanks to a trade with the Denver Broncos the previous year, the Seahawks had two first-round picks in the draft, which they used to select left tackle Russell Okung from Oklahoma State University and safety Earl Thomas from the University of Texas. Their second-round pick was used to draft wide receiver Golden Tate from Notre Dame University. Among the many roster moves the team made included signing running back Leon Washington, defensive end Raheem Brock, and wide receiver Mike Williams; releasing wide receiver T. J. Houshmandzadeh, running back Julius Jones and fullback Owen Schmitt. The Seahawks also traded for backup quarterback Charlie Whitehurst during the offseason, and running back Marshawn Lynch in Week 5.

The team got off to a promising 4–2 start, with Seattle returning two kickoffs for touchdowns in Week 3 for a 27–20 win over the San Diego Chargers and the Seahawks defense causing six sacks of Chicago Bears quarterback Jay Cutler in a Week 5 23–20 win. The team displayed plenty of weaknesses, however, and each of their losses during the regular season was by no fewer than 15 points. Blowout losses included a two-week stretch against the Oakland Raiders and New York Giants where the team was outscored 78–10. Despite coming into the final week of the season with a 6–9 record, they were still eligible to a playoff spot thanks to the extreme weakness of the NFC West, and Whitehurst's backup performance in their regular season finale against the St. Louis Rams was enough to clinch the NFC West title with a 16–6 win, making the Seahawks the first division champion in NFL history to finish the season with a losing record.

In the playoffs' Wild Card match up, the Seahawks hosted the defending Super Bowl champion New Orleans Saints, who had previously beaten the Seahawks 34–19 in Week 11. Though they fell behind by 10 points on two separate occasions during the game, a 4-touchdown performance by Hasselbeck (two to Brandon Stokley) and an electrifying 67-yard touchdown run by Marshawn Lynch late in the game propelled the Seahawks to a stunning 41–36 upset over the Saints. The game also was noteworthy for a small earthquake produced by the enormous noise generated by the 12th Man (Seahawks fans) at Qwest Field. The "Beast-quake", as it was called, was a 67-yard breakaway touchdown run by Marshawn Lynch (Seattle's running back who earned the nickname "Beast Mode") which was the margin of victory. Reaction by the home crowd to the play resonated as seismic activity to local seismologists, thus earning the moniker. Lynch broke 9 tackles on the play and it was the winning touchdown. It was also Hasselbeck's final game there, where he had played from 2001 to 2010.

The Seahawks then traveled to Chicago for a rematch with the Bears in the divisional round, but as most experts predicted, the latter won the game easily: thanks to two passing touchdowns and two rushing touchdowns by Jay Cutler, the Bears jumped out to a 21-0 halftime lead and eventually defeated the Seahawks 35–24. It marked the third time in five years that the Seahawks were eliminated in the divisional round, and the second time by the Bears.

2011

In 2011, the Seahawks let Hasselbeck go and made free agent acquisition Tarvaris Jackson their starting quarterback. The Seahawks opened 2-6 and then went on a 5–1 run capped by a big win against the Chicago Bears by a score of 38-14 pulling their record to 7-7. But, the Seahawks lost a home game against the San Francisco 49ers 19-17 and then lost to the Arizona Cardinals on the road in overtime. So, the team finished 7-9 which, unlike the previous year, wasn't enough to get them into the playoffs.

2012

Russell Wilson’s rookie year

During the offseason, the Seahawks changed their logo and uniforms. The team signed former Green Bay Packers backup quarterback Matt Flynn to replace departing quarterback Tarvaris Jackson, and also drafted rookie quarterback Russell Wilson as the 75th pick in the third round of the 2012 NFL Draft. Though Flynn was signed with the intention of being the starter for the 2012 season, Wilson's preseason performances were impressive enough that coach Carroll decided to name Wilson the starter for Week 1 against the Cardinals.

The season started sluggishly. The team went 2–2 in the first four games, including a controversial 14-12 Monday night win in Week 3 over the Packers in which the sloppy officiating by replacement referees caused enough of a media outcry to convince the NFL and its Referees Association to reach a deal. Although the Seahawks reached the end of Week 12 with a middling 6–5 record, signs of a breakout by Russell Wilson were apparent in a come-from-behind victory over the New England Patriots in Week 6, and convincing wins over the Minnesota Vikings and New York Jets in consecutive weeks.

The Week 13 game on the road against the Chicago Bears was a turning point in the season for the Seahawks. Down 14-10 late in the fourth quarter, Wilson orchestrated a 97-yard touchdown drive to take the lead, and when the Bears tied the game at the end of regulation, the Seahawks drove the ball another 80 yards in the first possession of overtime to seal a 23–17 win. From there, the Seahawks went on a rampage, winning its next three games against the Arizona Cardinals, Buffalo Bills, and San Francisco 49ers by a combined score of 150–30. They finished the season with an 11–5 record and qualified for the playoffs as the Wild Card. as the 49ers' 11-4-1 record edged the Seahawks out for the NFC West title.

Their Wild Card game was played in Washington against the fourth-seeded Washington Redskins. Despite falling behind early in the first quarter by a score of 14–0, the Seahawks scored 24 unanswered points in the second and fourth quarters to win 24–14. It was their first road playoff win since 1983. They then travelled to Atlanta to play the Divisional playoff game against the top-seeded Atlanta Falcons. Once again, the Seahawks found themselves down big early, taking a 20–0 deficit to the locker room at halftime. A frantic fourth-quarter comeback allowed them to take the lead 28–27 with less than a minute to go in the game, but the Falcons were able to mount a quick drive and score a field goal with under 10 seconds left, and the Seahawks lost by the score of 30–28.

Highlights of the season include Russell Wilson starting all games for the Seahawks, becoming the first rookie quarterback since Jim Zorn in their inaugural season to do so. Wilson finished the year tying the record for touchdown passes by a rookie quarterback with 26, a record he shares with Peyton Manning. His three touchdown runs in the Week 15 game against the Bills was also a franchise record. Wilson received an invitation to the 2013 Pro Bowl, along with running back Marshawn Lynch, offensive tackle Russell Okung, center Max Unger, free safety Earl Thomas, and kick returner Leon Washington.

2013:  Super Bowl Champions

In the offseason, the Seahawks looked to bolster their pass rush through free agency, signing defensive lineman Michael Bennett from the Tampa Bay Buccaneers and Cliff Avril of the Detroit Lions. They also acquired wide receiver Percy Harvin in a trade with the Minnesota Vikings for the Seahawks' first-round draft pick in the 2013 draft. Despite not having a first-round pick, the Seahawks managed to make 11 picks in the draft, including running back Christine Michael in the 2nd round, tight end Luke Willson in the 5th round, and offensive tackle Michael Bowie in the 7th round. Departures included running back Leon Washington who was released in the offseason, and fullback Michael Robinson who was cut during training camp, but returned to the team after injuries to Derrick Coleman and Spencer Ware.

The Seahawks got out to a fast start in the regular season, winning their first four games for the first time in franchise history. Wins during this stretch included a 29-3 trouncing of the San Francisco 49ers in Week 2, and an overtime win over the Houston Texans in Week 4 in which cornerback Richard Sherman returned an interception 58 yards to tie the game late in regulation. Their first loss was a 34–28 defeat in Week 5 at the hands of the Indianapolis Colts, notable for a blocked field goal attempt by kicker Steven Hauschka that was returned by the Colts for a touchdown. Injuries to many of the starting offensive line players caused difficulties in the middle of the season, with left tackle Russell Okung and right tackle Breno Giacomini both missing long stretches of time, and although Percy Harvin dazzled the crowd with an acrobatic catch and a long punt return in the game against his former team in Week 11, a nagging hip injury kept him off the field for the rest of the season. Despite these setbacks, the Seahawks managed to rattle off seven straight wins, taking control of the conference in Week 13 with a 34-7 blowout of the New Orleans Saints where the home crowd set a new Guinness World Record for the loudest outdoor stadium with a 137.6 decibel reading at one point during the game, reclaiming the record from the Kansas City Chiefs who had broken the record in Week 6. Although the Seahawks were the first team to clinch a playoff berth, losses to the 49ers and Cardinals in weeks 14 and 16 prevented them from clinching the division until the end of the season. Fortunately, the Seahawks defeated the St. Louis Rams handily in the regular season finale by a score of 27–9, clinching their second NFC West championship since Pete Carroll became head coach, as well as wrapping up homefield advantage throughout the NFC playoffs with the #1 seed.

The Seahawks' 13-3 regular season record marked the second time in franchise history that the team had won 13 regular season games (the previous time being in 2005). Other franchise milestones achieved included their best ever 12-game start (11-1), as well as the first time the team has won 11 or more games in back-to-back seasons. In addition, six Seahawks were named to the 2014 Pro Bowl as a result of their performances: quarterback Russell Wilson, running back Marshawn Lynch, center Max Unger, cornerback Richard Sherman, strong safety Kam Chancellor and free safety Earl Thomas.

Their first playoff game was played on January 11 against the New Orleans Saints, in a rematch of both the Week 13 regular season game as well as the 2011 Wild Card game. Once again, the Seahawks prevailed on the back of a late rushing touchdown by Marshawn Lynch, and staved off a furious comeback attempt by the Saints to win 23–15. On January 19, they played in the NFC Championship Game versus their division rivals, the San Francisco 49ers. Despite a fumble by Russell Wilson on the first play from scrimmage, the Seahawks kept the game close in the first half, trailing 10–3. From there, the Seahawks got a 40-yard touchdown rush from Lynch, a 35-yard touchdown reception from Jermaine Kearse, plus interceptions of 49ers quarterback Colin Kaepernick from strong safety Kam Chancellor and linebacker Malcolm Smith in the fourth quarter. The game was capped off by a dramatic defensive stand, in which the 49ers threatened to score a game-winning touchdown in the final minute. With 22 seconds left to play, however, Kaepernick's throw to receiver Michael Crabtree in the end zone was deflected by Sherman into the hands of Malcolm Smith, securing the victory for the Seahawks in a play that has since gone down in Seahawks lore as "The Tip".

The Seahawks won by a final score of 23–17, sending the Seahawks to Super Bowl XLVIII as the NFC representative, their second trip to the Super Bowl in franchise history.

Super Bowl XLVIII

On February 2, 2014, the Seahawks played in Super Bowl XLVIII against the Denver Broncos, pitting the league's #1 defense (Seattle) against the #1 offense (Denver). The Broncos offense, led by future Hall of Fame quarterback Peyton Manning, had broken a number of NFL offense records including most points scored in a single season. Leading up to the Super Bowl, many were hailing the Denver Broncos as the best offense ever to play the game.  (Denver and Seattle were division rivals in the AFC West before Seattle was moved to the NFC West in 2002). After kicking off to start the first half, the Seahawks immediately benefited from a miscue by the Broncos when the first snap of the game went over the head of Peyton Manning, which went into the end zone for a safety 12 seconds into the game. Seattle added two field goals in the first quarter to take an 8–0 lead. After Kam Chancellor intercepted a pass by Manning on the following drive, the Seahawks drove the ball 37 yards capped off by a 1-yard touchdown run by Marshawn Lynch to make the score 15–0. On the very next drive, Manning was picked off yet again by Malcolm Smith, who returned the interception 69 yards for a touchdown, blowing the game wide open with a 22–0 lead that the Seahawks eventually took into the locker room for halftime.

The Seahawks received the second half kickoff, which Percy Harvin took 87 yards for yet another touchdown (12 seconds into the second half), making the Seahawks the first team to score an offensive, defensive, and special teams touchdown since the Los Angeles Raiders in Super Bowl XVIII. Russell Wilson also recorded two passing touchdowns, one to Doug Baldwin and one to Jermaine Kearse. Although the Broncos broke the shutout with a 14-yard touchdown catch by Demaryius Thomas, that was all their scoring. The Seahawks won Super Bowl XLVIII by a final score of 43–8.

The win marked the Seahawks' first Super Bowl Championship in franchise history. Russell Wilson finished with 206 passing yards and two touchdowns having won the Super Bowl in just his second year in the NFL, while the Seahawks defense logged four takeaways. Malcolm Smith was named Super Bowl MVP thanks in large part to his interception return and a fumble recovery in the second half.

Upon returning to Seattle, the Seahawks, in true fashion, put together a parade to thank their fans (The 12th Man) and their city of over 13 million Seahawks fans.

2014: Second Consecutive Super Bowl Appearance

For the first time in franchise history, the Seahawks started a season as the defending Super Bowl champions.  As such, they earned the right to host the NFL Kickoff Game, where they defeated the Green Bay Packers 36–16.  Then in Week 2, they traveled to San Diego, where the Chargers defeated them by a score of 30–21.  This was Seattle's worst defeat since a 23–13 loss to the Dallas Cowboys in Week 9 of the 2011 season.  Then in Week 3, they returned home to face the Denver Broncos in a rematch of Super Bowl XLVIII.  Seattle took a 17–3 lead going into halftime, but the Broncos rallied in the fourth quarter to tie the game at 20-20.  The game went into overtime, where Seattle scored a touchdown to win 26–20.  After a bye in Week 4, they defeated the Redskins at Washington 27–17 on Monday Night Football.  The following week, they suffered a 30–23 loss at home to the Dallas Cowboys, only their second home loss (including playoffs) since Russell Wilson became quarterback.  After that, they traveled to St. Louis to face their divisional rival, the Rams, where they suffered their third loss of the season, 28–26, bringing their record to 3-3.  However, from this point on Seattle caught fire, winning all but one of their remaining ten regular season games.  First, they defeated the struggling Carolina Panthers on the road, 13–9, then they defeated the (then) winless Oakland Raiders 30–24 at home.  Next, they blew out the New York Giants 38–17 in a second consecutive home game, before losing to the Chiefs in Kansas City, 24–20.  This was their last defeat during the regular season.  They won their next two games by identical scores of 19–3, first against their divisional rival Arizona Cardinals at home and then against San Francisco on the road in a prime-time game on Thanksgiving Day.  After that, they traveled to Philadelphia and defeated the Eagles 24-14 before returning home to face San Francisco in a rematch of their Thanksgiving Day game.  The Seahawks won 17–7 to sweep the 49ers for the first time in seven years and officially eliminate them from playoff contention.  Finally, the Seahawks traveled to Arizona and defeated the Cardinals 35–6 on NBC Sunday Night Football before returning home to defeat the Rams 20–6 in the regular season finale to capture the NFC West title for the second consecutive season and a final regular season record of 12–4, tied with the Packers and Cowboys for best in the NFC.  Due to tiebreakers (Seattle had the best record in inter-conference games out of the three), Seattle clinched the #1 seed in the NFC playoffs for the 2nd consecutive season.  They were the first team in either conference to repeat as their conference's #1 seed since the 2013 Denver Broncos did it and the first NFC team to do it since the 2004 Philadelphia Eagles.  As the Seahawks were the defending Super Bowl champions, this marked the first time that a defending Super Bowl champion won their conference's #1 seed the next season since the 1990 San Francisco 49ers.

By virtue of having the #1 seed in the playoffs, the Seahawks earned a first-round bye and home-field advantage throughout the playoffs.  After their first-round bye, they defeated the Carolina Panthers, the second team in NFL history to qualify for the postseason (and win a playoff game) in a full season with a losing (sub-.500) record, in the Divisional round by a score of 31–17.  This made them the first defending champion since the 2005 Patriots to win a playoff game the following season.  Then the next week, they faced the Green Bay Packers in the NFC Championship Game.  The Seahawks struggled for much of the game, largely due to quarterback Russell Wilson throwing four interceptions.  They were shut out in the first half 16-0, but after a fake field goal attempt-turned-touchdown pass from Jon Ryan to Gary Gilliam, the Seahawks trailed 16-7 with 4:44 remaining in the third quarter. After a successful Mason Crosby field goal, Seattle's defense then managed to force Green Bay to punt at 5:00 left in regulation, giving them the ball on their own 31-yard line.  Then, in seven plays, Seattle drove 69 yards to score a touchdown and cut their deficit to 19–14 with 2:09 left in regulation.  The Seahawks then decided to attempt an onside kick, which they recovered successfully.  Four plays later, with 1:25 remaining in regulation, the Seahawks scored a second touchdown and successfully converted the two-point conversion to take their first lead of the game, 22–19.  After the ensuing kickoff, Green Bay managed to quickly drive downfield and kick a field goal with 14 seconds left in regulation to tie the game and force overtime.  Seattle won the overtime coin toss and received possession first.  Starting on their own 13-yard line, they capped off one of the greatest comebacks in franchise and league history by driving for six plays worth 87 yards in 3:19, capped off with a 35-yard touchdown pass from Russell Wilson to Jermaine Kearse, who had been Wilson's intended target on all four of Seattle's interceptions.  The final score was Seattle 28, Green Bay 22.  Thus Seattle became the first defending champion since the 2004 New England Patriots to return to the Super Bowl the next season.  They also became the first NFC team since the 1997 Green Bay Packers to repeat as NFC Champions, the first team to go to consecutive Super Bowls as the #1 seed in the playoffs since the 1990–1991 Buffalo Bills, and the first NFC team to go to consecutive Super Bowls as the #1 seed in the playoffs since the 1982–1983 Washington Redskins.

Super Bowl XLIX

On Sunday, February 1, 2015, in Super Bowl XLIX, the Seahawks faced off against Tom Brady and the New England Patriots, seeking to become the first team to win two consecutive Super Bowls since the Patriots themselves won Super Bowl XXXVIII and Super Bowl XXXIX following the 2003 and 2004 seasons, respectively.  After a scoreless first quarter, both teams scored two touchdowns in the second quarter, and the game was tied 14–14 at halftime.  In the third quarter, the Seahawks scored a field goal and a touchdown to take a ten-point lead, which they held going into the fourth quarter.  However, Seattle became the first team in NFL history to blow a 10-point fourth quarter lead in a Super Bowl, as New England scored two touchdowns to take the lead, 28–24 with 2:02 remaining.  On their final possession, Seattle managed to drive to New England's 1-yard line and run the clock down to 26 seconds.  Then Seattle decided to call a passing play rather than a running play, despite having talented running back Marshawn Lynch on their offense.  Unfortunately for Seattle, Wilson's throw was intercepted by New England's rookie cornerback Malcolm Butler, which gave New England possession on their own one-yard line with 20 seconds remaining.  This final play by Seattle was almost immediately criticized by many after the game as one of the worst calls in Super Bowl history.  However, the game was not quite over, as the Patriots could not take a quarterback kneeldown without risking giving up a safety, which would give the Seahawks two points and possession of the ball.  However, defensive lineman Michael Bennett was flagged for encroachment, which moved the ball out to the 6-yard line.  When Brady attempted to take a knee to end the game, linebacker Bruce Irvin threw a closed hand punch at Patriots tight end Rob Gronkowski, starting a brawl involving players from both teams that resulted in an unsportsmanlike conduct penalty for Seattle.  In addition to the unsportsmanlike conduct penalty, Irvin was ejected from the game, making him the first player ever to be ejected from a Super Bowl.  After the game, Irvin was fined $10,000.  Brady took a kneeldown at the 21-yard line to run out the rest of the clock and seal Seattle's fate.  The Seahawks became the tenth consecutive team to be dethroned of their Super Bowl title, creating a record for the most years without a repeat Super Bowl champion.

2015: The Quest For A 4th Super Bowl Appearance

The 2015 season marked the 40th season of play for the Seahawks.

Prior to the 2015 draft, the Seahawks made a blockbuster trade with the New Orleans Saints, trading Seattle's first-round pick for All-Pro Saints tight end Jimmy Graham. For this reason, the Seahawks did not have a first-round pick, but did make a total of eight picks in the draft, including defensive end Frank Clark in the second round, wide receiver and return specialist Tyler Lockett in the third round. Among the major free agency signings made by the team included cornerback Cary Williams, who replaced outgoing corner Walter Thurmond who had signed with the Philadelphia Eagles.

The season began with two consecutive road losses. Despite taking a 31–24 lead late in the fourth quarter against the Rams, a defensive breakdown allowed a touchdown by the Rams in the final minute, and the Rams prevailed in overtime 34–31. The following week, the Seahawks traveled to Green Bay to face the Packers, and lost 27–17, their first loss by double digits in 59 regular season games (67 games including the postseason). However, the team righted the ship with two straight wins against the hapless Chicago Bears and the Detroit Lions on Monday Night - the latter win ending controversially when a last-second play by Lions received Calvin Johnson was fumbled at the 1-yard line and linebacker KJ Wright batted the ball out of the back of the end zone for a safety. Although this could have been ruled a penalty against the Seahawks, which would have given possession to the Lions at the -yard line, no penalty was called.

The Seahawks struggled for much of the year. They lost their next two games against the Cincinnati Bengals and the Carolina Panthers, blowing leads of 17 and 9 points against each opponent. Two straight wins against the 49ers and the Dallas Cowboys followed, although the Cowboys game was marred by a serious and eventually career-ending neck injury to Seahawks receiver Ricardo Lockette. A loss to the division-leading Cardinals followed, after which was another win against the 49ers which was highlighted by rookie running back Thomas Rawls piling up 209 rushing yards in relief for an ailing Marshawn Lynch, who was sidelined for several games with a back injury.

In week 12, the Seahawks faced the Pittsburgh Steelers for the third time since losing to them in Super Bowl XL. The game ended up being an offensive shootout, and a late touchdown by Doug Baldwin sealed a 39–30 victory, getting them over .500 for the first time in 2015. It was their first win against the Steelers since 2003. However, the team suffered another devastating injury as Jimmy Graham suffered a broken patella early in the game, and was lost for the year.

The Seahawks regained their stride during the homestretch, finish the year 4-1 - the one loss being in Week 16 against the Rams, who swept the Seahawks in the regular season for the first time since 2004. They finished the year 10–6, good enough for second place in the division (Arizona won the NFC West with a 13–3 record, earning the #2 seed.) and earning the #6 seed in the NFC Playoffs. Also worth noting was that the Seahawks overall team record rose above .500 for the first time in franchise history; their Week 14 win against the Baltimore Ravens brought the record to 313-312-0.

Minnesota held the Seahawks scoreless until the fourth quarter, but could not reach the end zone themselves and had to settle for field goals the whole game. The Seahawks managed to score a touchdown and a field goal deep in the fourth quarter to take a 10–9 lead, but the Vikings seemed poised to score a fourth field goal and win until Vikings kicker Blair Walsh missed a 27-yard chip shot, allowing the Seahawks to escape with the victory. However, the Seahawks' luck ran out in the divisional round, against the #1 seed Carolina Panthers. In one of the most disastrous first halves in team history, the Panthers ran the Seahawks off the field to the tune of a 31-0 halftime lead. The Seahawks made it a game in the second half, bringing the score all the way back to 31–24, but failed to recover an onside kick in the final two minutes of play to seal their fate.

Still, the Seahawks enjoyed their fifth consecutive year of ten or more wins, their longest streak in franchise history. The Seahawks also sent seven players to the Pro Bowl, including Russell Wilson, Michael Bennett, Earl Thomas, and Tyler Lockett.

2016

The Seahawks began the 2016 season 4–1. In their next game against the Arizona Cardinals, they ended the game 6-6, the first tie in franchise history. The Seahawks had some impressive victories, including the complete dismantling of the Carolina Panthers 40–7.  In week 15, they beat the Los Angeles Rams 24–3 to clinch their third NFC West title in the last four years. The Seahawks finished the season as the third seed in the NFC at 10-5-1. They went on to dominate the Detroit Lions in the Wild Card Round 26–6, but lost in the Divisional Round to the eventual NFC champion Atlanta Falcons 36–20.

2017: Missing the Playoffs

The 2017 season was the final season of the original Legion of Boom playing together, as well as the 21st and last full season under the ownership of Paul Allen, who died during the 2018 season. The Seahawks were hoping to improve their 10–5–1 record from 2016. However, it didn't happen because of a lack of consistency in the running game, special teams, and the offensive line combined with numerous injuries. The Seahawks started the season well at 8–4. They had an impressive win when they held the eventual Super Bowl LII champions, the Philadelphia Eagles, to just 10 points in their 24–10 victory. However, they lost 3 of their next 4 games, including a 42–7 home loss at the hands of the Los Angeles Rams. They finished the season 9–7, marking the first time since 2011 that the Seahawks failed to achieve double-digit wins. It was also the first time since that same year that they did not qualify for the playoffs. Russell Wilson finished as the league's leader in touchdown passes with 34, and finished as the team's leading rusher with 586 yards.

2018: Return to the Playoffs

There were low expectations for the Seahawks in the 2018 season. Many key players left the team. Cornerback Richard Sherman, defensive lineman Cliff Avril, and punter Jon Ryan were all released. Tight ends Jimmy Graham and Luke Willson, wide receiver Paul Richardson, and running back Thomas Rawls all departed in free agency. Kam Chancellor announced his retirement on July 1, 2018, due to the neck injury he sustained in week 10 of the previous season. In week 4 against the Arizona Cardinals, free safety Earl Thomas broke a bone in his left leg and missed the remainder of the season. Some of the players that were picked in the 2018 NFL Draft include first rounder running back Rashaad Penny, standout tight end Will Dissly, eventual Pro Bowler punter Michael Dickson, and the first one-handed player in NFL history, Shaquem Griffin.

Paul Allen, owner of the Seahawks since 1997, died of cancer on October 15, 2018, at the age of 65.

The Seahawks started the season on the wrong foot, starting 0-2 and having given up 12 sacks and averaging 68 yards rushing a game. They won their next two games narrowly, but the Seahawks completely turned around the season in week 5. Although they lost to the Los Angeles Rams 33–31, they put up an impressive 190 rushing yards and won the turnover battle 2–0. The Seahawks preceded to win their next two, including against the Oakland Raiders in their first NFL International Series game in London, England. They then fell to both of the Los Angeles teams, the Rams and the Chargers, but then went on a rampage, winning 6 of their next 7. Some notable wins, were against the 6-2 Carolina Panthers and against the eventual MVP Patrick Mahomes and the 11-3 Kansas City Chiefs. With that win, they clinched the a playoff berth and eventually finished the season as the 5th seed in the NFC at 10–6.

In the Wild Card game, they dueled with the 4th seed Dallas Cowboys. The Seahawks, however, could never get their run game going and, combined with kicker Sebastian Janikowski's injury at the end of the first half, led to them being down 10 with 2:08 remaining, the score being 24–14. The Seahawks rallied for a touchdown and subsequent two point conversion to cut the deficit to 2, but failed to recover Michael Dickson's drop kick onside kick, ending the game with a final score of 24–22.

2019

The Seahawks again started the season down many key players. They officially terminated the contract of strong safety Kam Chancellor and also wide receiver Doug Baldwin after failed physicals. They also traded defensive end Frank Clark to the Kansas City Chiefs. However, they did pick up many notable players. One was top wide receiver prospect DK Metcalf with the 64th pick of the Draft. They beefed up their defensive line by signing defensive end Ezekiel Ansah to a one-year contract, and traded Jacob Martin, Barkevious Mingo, and a third-round pick for defensive end Jadeveon Clowney.

The Seahawks started the 2019 season 2–0 with wins over the Cincinnati Bengals and the Pittsburgh Steelers, marking their first 2–0 start since the 2013 season, in which they won the Super Bowl. They proceeded to fall to the New Orleans Saints, falling 6 points short of a 20-point comeback. This was their first home loss in September in the Pete Carroll era. The Seahawks rebounded, winning two straight divisional matchups, beating the Arizona Cardinals 27–10 on the road and the Los Angeles Rams on Thursday Night 30–29 at home. During their week 6 matchup against the Cleveland Browns, tight end Will Dissly tore his Achilles tendon and was placed on injured reserve for the second season in a row. The Seahawks ended up winning the game 32–28. The following week, the Seahawks played the Baltimore Ravens, who had signed Earl Thomas in the offseason. The Ravens prevailed, winning 30–16, marking Russell Wilson's only game with a passer rating of under 100 the whole season as well as his first interception. The Seahawks edged out the Atlanta Falcons 27–20 in their next game, which marked the first time the Seahawks were 4–0 on the road since 1980. The Seahawks managed to rally past the Tampa Bay Buccaneers 40–34 in overtime, with Russell Wilson throwing a season high 5 touchdowns, with Jacob Hollister, picked up off waivers from the New England Patriots and Tyler Lockett caught two apiece. The Seahawks played a thriller on the road against the 8-0 San Francisco 49ers, prevailing in their second overtime game in a row, 27–24, with Jason Myers making the game-winning field goal as time expired. The Seahawks continued the forward momentum and won their next two games, but lost to the Rams 28-12 for their first and only road loss of the season. The Seahawks' 7-1 road record was the best in franchise history. The Seahawks rebounded against the Carolina Panthers 30–24, clinching a playoff spot, but lost their final two home divisional games in a row, including a nail-biting week 17 rematch with the 49ers in which Jacob Hollister fell just inches from the goalline on 4th and goal. The two losses were influenced by the loss of three running backs in the last few games of the season, Chris Carson, Rashaad Penny, and C. J. Prosise. This lead them to sign ex-Seahawks running-back Marshawn Lynch, who was in his second retirement.

The Seahawks finished as the 5th seed in the NFC, and played a Week 12 rematch against the Philadelphia Eagles for the Wild Card round. While the Seahawks' pass rush was nearly non-existent during the season (registering just 28 sacks the entire season) they went on a rampage, recording 7 sacks during the game. DK Metcalf also broke the NFL record for most receiving yards by a rookie in their postseason debut with 160 yards. The Seahawks won, ironically, with the same score as the matchup earlier in the season, 17–9. In the Divisional round, the Seahawks matched up against the 13-3 Green Bay Packers. The Seahawks fell behind early, trailing 21–3 at halftime. However, the Seahawks came roaring back, thanks to two Marshawn Lynch touchdowns as well as one from Tyler Lockett, and trailed 28-23 late in the fourth quarter. The Seahawks managed to get the ball back with 4:54 remaining, but could not get a touchdown and were forced to punt. Their season ended on a controversial first-down pass from Aaron Rodgers to Jimmy Graham, resulting in the Packers winning 28–23.

2020: Division champions

The Seahawks made some big moves during the offseason, adding All-Pro star safety Jamal Adams from the New York Jets in a blockbuster trade in exchange for safety Bradley McDougald, a first-round and third-round pick in 2021, and a 2022 first-round pick, and lockdown corner Quinton Dunbar from the Washington Football Team to bolster their secondary. They also added wide receiver Phillip Dorsett from the Patriots veteran tight-end Greg Olsen from the Panthers. and running back Carlos Hyde from the Houston Texans, who racked up 1070 yards in the 2019 season, to fill in for a still injured Rashaad Penny. A notable loss was Jadeveon Clowney signing with the Tennessee Titans after a long free agency stalemate.

Due to the COVID-19 pandemic, the NFL preseason was canceled for the 2020 season in its entirety.

In the first game of the season, the Seahawks started on the road against the Atlanta Falcons. In this game, the Seahawks abandoned their "run first" philosophy and answered fans calls to "let Russ cook." Russell Wilson had a career day, completing 31/35 passes (88.6%) for 322 yards, 4 touchdowns and no interceptions. The Seahawks breezed past the Falcons 38–25, but the defense surrendered 450 passing yards to Falcons quarterback Matt Ryan. In the next two home games, each with no fans present (due to COVID-19 concerns), the Seahawks edged out the New England Patriots and the Dallas Cowboys, with Wilson throwing 5 touchdown passes in each, setting the NFL record for most touchdown passes through the first three games of the season. The Seahawks defense continued to give up a lot of passing yards, allowing 397 and 472 in those two games, respectively. A win over the Miami Dolphins followed by a comeback victory over the Minnesota Vikings marked the first 5–0 start in franchise history. The Seahawks suffered their first loss of the season at the hands of the Arizona Cardinals, which ended with a Zane Gonzalez field goal in the waning seconds of overtime. The Seahawks bounced back with a 37–27 victory over their division rivals, the San Francisco 49ers, with their defense allowing just 117 yards and one touchdown through the first three quarters of play. However, any progress made by the Seahawks defense was erased the following week against the Buffalo Bills, as they allowed 415 yards, an 81.6% completion percentage, and 4 total touchdowns to quarterback Josh Allen as the Seahawks suffered their second loss in three weeks, having given up 44 points, the most since Pete Carroll took over as head coach. They suffered their third loss in four outings against the Los Angeles Rams.

On November 19, 2020, the Seahawks announced that CenturyLink Field was renamed to Lumen Field due to CenturyLink rebranding as Lumen Technologies starting on their Thursday night rematch with the Cardinals. They won the game 28–21, with their defense turning a corner, holding the Cardinals' top-ranked offense to 314 yards, compared to 519 in their last meeting. Dunlap had 2 sacks and three quarterback hits, including the game winning sack on fourth down with under a minute to play. The defensive momentum continued into the next matchup with the Philadelphia Eagles, where the defense had 6 sacks, an interception, and didn't allow a first down until the Eagles' 6th drive. They also allowed 250 total yards and 17 points, both season bests. Their offense was shut down by the New York Giants as they were upset 17–12, but they bounced back against the then-winless New York Jets 40–3. After a narrow 20–15 win over the Washington Football Team, the Seahawks' defense dominated the Rams, beating them 20–9 and clinching the NFC West for the first time since 2016. They rounded out the season with a 26–23 win over the 49ers.

The Seahawks achieved a record of 12–4 for just the third time in team history, as well as tying for the second best record in franchise history. Finishing 12–4 landed them in the 3rd seed of the NFC and set up a third meeting with the Rams. Quarterback Russell Wilson finished the regular season with 40 passing touchdowns, besting his own record of 35. He came up just 8 yards short of breaking the franchise record of 4,219 passing yards, also set by himself back in 2016. Wide receiver DK Metcalf broke Steve Largent's record for receiving yards in a season with 1,303. Wide receiver Tyler Lockett broke Bobby Engram and Doug Baldwin's record of receptions in a season with 100. Kicker Jason Myers did not miss a field goal the entire season, with a streak of 35 makes extending into last season. The Seahawks fell to the Rams for the first home playoff loss in the Pete Carroll era by a score of 30–20. The game marked their third playoff loss in the last four years, compared to just one win. Their offense only mustered 2 touchdowns, one of which came when down by 17 late in the fourth quarter. Wilson played badly throughout thanks to poor offensive line play. In addition to being sacked five times, he completed just 11 of 27 passes for 174 yards, 2 touchdowns, and 1 interception, with the interception being a 42-yard pick six.

References

Seattle Seahawks
Seattle Seahawks